Akhlaq Qureshi (born 7 February 1962) is a Pakistani-born former Italian international cricketer. He was a right-handed batsman and a right-arm medium-pace bowler who first played cricket back in the 1984/85 season. He made his cricketing debut for the Lahore City Whites in 1984, on the losing side of a Patron's Trophy match, where he scored 50 in the second innings. He later played 3 List A games in the 1998 Wills Cup.

His cricketing career found a new lease of life when he moved to Italy and decided to represent the new Italian team. He played in their first registered match, against Ireland in the 1996 European Championship, in the 1997 ICC Trophy and in the 1998, 2000 and 2002 European championships.

While playing in Pakistan, he was a lower-order batsman, however, by 1998, he had moved to the middle order for the Italians, also bowling economical medium-pace.

References

Pakistani cricketers
Italian cricketers
Lahore City cricketers
Lahore City Whites cricketers
Cricketers from Lahore
1962 births
Living people
Pakistani emigrants to Italy
Pakistani expatriate sportspeople